The Wallis and Futuna national badminton team represents Wallis and Futuna, an Overseas collectivity of France, in international badminton team competitions. It became an associate member of Badminton Oceania in August 2021. The team made its international debut at the 2022 Pacific Mini Games in Saipan, Northern Mariana Islands, in June 2022.

The Wallisian and Futunan team won third place on their debut in the Pacific Mini Games. The team won the group team matches against Guam, Northern Mariana Islands and Solomon Islands.

Participation in Pacific Mini Games
Mixed team

Current squad 
The following players were selected to represent Wallis and Futuna at the 2022 Pacific Mini Games.

Male players
Damien Coffin
Julien Dauptain
Corentin Likiliki

Female players
Caroline Brial
Leilana Likuvalu
Malia Takasi
Endrina Tukumuli Nau

References

Badminton
National badminton teams